Narkle is a surname. Notable people with the surname include:

Keith Narkle (born 1952), Australian rules footballer
Lynette Narkle (born 1946), Australian actor and director
Phil Narkle (born 1961), Australian rules footballer
Quinton Narkle (born 1997), Australian rules footballer